Peleopoda convoluta is a moth in the family Depressariidae. It was described by W. Donald Duckworth in 1970. It is found in Venezuela.

References

Moths described in 1970
Peleopoda